Interstate 35W (I-35W) is an Interstate Highway in the US state of Minnesota, passing through downtown Minneapolis. It is one of two through routes for I-35 through the Twin Cities of Minneapolis and Saint Paul, the other being I-35E through downtown Saint Paul.

It runs through the city of Minneapolis before rejoining with I-35E to reform I-35 in Columbus near Forest Lake. I-35W supplanted sections of old U.S. Highway 8 (US 8) northeast of Minneapolis and old US 65 south of Minneapolis that have since been removed from the United States Numbered Highway System.

During the early years of the Interstate Highway System, branching Interstates with directional suffixes, such as N, S, E, and W, were common nationwide. On every other Interstate nationwide, these directional suffixes have been phased out by redesignating the suffixed route numbers with a loop or spur route number designation (such as I-270 in Maryland, which was once I-70S) or, in some cases, were assigned a different route number (such as I-76, which was once I-80S). In the case of I-35 in the Twin Cities area, since neither branch is clearly the main route and both branches return to a unified Interstate beyond the cities of Minneapolis and Saint Paul, officials at the American Association of State Highway and Transportation Officials (AASHTO) have allowed the suffixes of E and W in Minnesota to remain in the present day. I-35 also splits into I-35E and I-35W in Dallas–Fort Worth, Texas, for similar reasons as the I-35 split in the Minneapolis–Saint Paul area.

Route description

The southern terminus of I-35W is at Burnsville, where I-35 splits into I-35E and I-35W. While I-35E takes a northeasterly path into Saint Paul, I-35W heads north into Minneapolis. I-35W maintains a northbound direction in Burnsville with two lanes and adds a third lane at Burnsville Parkway. It then crosses the Minnesota River into Bloomington. At the Bloomington–Richfield city boundary, I-35W has a cloverleaf interchange with I-494 at exits 9A and 9B. I-35W and MN 62 split as two lanes of I-35W turn northbound toward downtown Minneapolis, where it adds back a third lane and then later a fourth and a fifth lane at the 46th Street onramp.

I-35W swerves slightly northeast immediately south of downtown to avoid the Washburn-Fair Oaks Mansion District. Three lanes then split north onto MN 65 (Old US 65), which exits into downtown. Here, the interchange with I-94/US 52 does not have direct access for southbound I-35W to eastbound I-94/southbound US 52 or westbound I-94/northbound US 52 to northbound I-35W. Drivers must use the Cedar and Washington avenue exits to make these connections. Alternatively, MN 280 provides an expressway link for motorists needing to make these connections. 

I-35W completes its eastern loop around downtown, and then crosses the Mississippi River on the St. Anthony Falls Bridge and winds northeast out of Northeast Minneapolis. Here, I-35W passes through industrial areas near the suburbs of St. Anthony, Lauderdale, Roseville, and Arden Hills.

I-35W then meets I-694 in New Brighton and Arden Hills at a cloverleaf interchange at exits 26B and 26C. I-35W and US 10 run concurrently for another  before the latter turns westward in Mounds View and Shoreview at exit 30. I-35W passes next to the former site of the Twin Cities Ordnance Plant and again turns northeastward through the suburbs of Blaine and Lino Lakes. The communities of Lexington and Circle Pines are also nearby throughout this stretch. I-35W then merges with I-35E to reform I-35 at Columbus near Forest Lake.

I-35W carries its own set of exit numbers in the Twin Cities area, while I-35E continues the I-35 exit numbering scheme, which goes between the Iowa state line and the city of Duluth. (The same setup also applies to the other I-35E/I-35W splits in Dallas–Fort Worth, Texas.)

Legally, the route of I-35W is defined as part of unmarked Legislative Route 394 in the Minnesota Statutes § 161.12(2); I-35W is not marked with this legislative number along the actual highway.

History

Flooding
I-35W is prone to heavy-rain event flooding in several areas, intersecting both natural habitats, including the Minnesota Valley National Wildlife Refuge between Burnsville and Bloomington, and the dense urban areas through the city of Minneapolis. In the great 1965 Minnesota River flood, the highway was underwater in the floodplain wetlands south of the Minnesota River bridge at Burnsville. Dikes have been constructed, and the highway has been raised since then. The storm sewer system under I-35W in the urban core of south Minneapolis has also been cited as a place prone to flashfloods during rain events. Improvements continue to be made to this area as part of future projects.

Minnesota River crossing

When the Minnesota River bridge between Burnsville and Bloomington was completed in 1960, it was two lanes in each direction. I-35W, at the time, only extended as far south as MN 13 in Burnsville. Improvements were made in 1984 to redeck and widen the bridge, but subsoil problems found at the north end resulted in the new lanes being temporarily closed. In 1989, the lanes were opened as high-occupancy vehicle lanes when the Minnesota Department of Transportation (MnDOT) expanded the north approach to carry the additional traffic.

Mississippi River crossing

On August 1, 2007, the I-35W Mississippi River bridge in Minneapolis collapsed into the Mississippi River around 6:05 pm CDT, killing 13 people and injuring 145. The bridge connected Minneapolis southwest of the Mississippi River to the Northeast Minneapolis neighborhood and served residents in the northern suburbs of the metro area. Because of the collapse of the bridge, I-35W traffic was temporarily detoured through eastbound I-94 to northbound MN 280 where it meets up with I-35W in Roseville.

The replacement I-35W Saint Anthony Falls Bridge was built in less than a year and opened to traffic on September 18, 2008, at 5:00 am CDT, three months ahead of schedule.

I-35W and Highway 62 Crosstown Commons reconstruction project

The Crosstown Commons is one of the most congested traffic interchanges in Minnesota. While it is sometimes referred to as an intersection, it is a  merger or concurrency of I-35W and MN 62. The layout is not a typical intersection: there is only a single level of roadbed and it creates a dogleg in I-35W. This shared right-of-way intersection for I-35W and MN 62 has been a topic of political debate for many years. There are only six lanes on the commons, and all drivers merging from one highway to the other are required to change at least one lane as they merge and then diverge again. The name comes from the fact that MN 62 is also known locally as the Crosstown Highway.

The project to improve the interchange began in May 2007 after bids were received in April 2007. The new interchange features three throughlanes for I-35W in both directions, ending at 42nd Street, and two separate throughlanes for MN 62 in each direction, eliminating the need to weave across traffic. The cost of correcting the deficiencies in that short stretch of highway was estimated to be $285 million (equivalent to $ in ).

In 2004, the City of Minneapolis threatened to withhold municipal consent for the project unless new bus lanes and bus stations were included. Lake Street currently has a bus station at grade with I-35W on both sides. Eventually, the project was altered to include the desired additional bus access. The bid was won by the Ames, Lunda, and Schafer consortium for the 2007 cost of $288 million (equivalent to $ in ). The project included 25 new bridges,  of highway, and expanded the total roadway width from six lanes to 12 lanes at Lyndale Avenue. The bridges were cast in Coates and trucked in for onsite erection. The new design includes transit/HOV lanes and was completed in November 2010.

35W@94: Downtown to Crosstown 	
The 35W@94 Downtown to Crosstown Project was a construction project to repave and reconfigure I-35W and I-94. The work took place from 15th Street to 43rd Street on I-35W, and I-94 from Portland Avenue to 3rd Avenue in Minneapolis. The project added a southbound entrance at County Road 3 (Lake Street), added a northbound exit to 28th Street, reconstructing and widening frontage roads to accommodate new ramps. HOV lanes using E-ZPass replaced the dynamic shoulder lanes in the center of the freeway. Retaining walls, noise barriers, and bridges being replaced throughout the entirety of the project. The METRO Orange Line uses a new station at Lake Street, and a bus-only transit ramp on 12th Street connecting I-35W to downtown. The entire project was completed in September 2021.

Future 
The proposed METRO Orange Line bus rapid transitway will run from the southern suburb of Lakeville to downtown Minneapolis on I-35W, passing through Burnsville, Bloomington, and Richfield. It will use HOV lanes and a transit ramp into downtown Minneapolis.

Exit list

References

External links

 

W (Minnesota)
Interstate Highway System
Interstate Highways in Minnesota
Interstate 35W
Interstate 35W
Interstate 35W
Interstate 35W
Interstate 35W
High-occupancy toll roads